Cray railway station served the village of Crai, in the historical county of Breconshire, Wales, from 1870 to 1962 on the Neath and Brecon Railway.

History 
The station first appeared in Bradshaw in February 1870, although it is mentioned as a station in an advertisement from 24 April 1869. It closed on 15 October 1962. The station building has been demolished and replaced by a single-storey house.

References

External links 

Disused railway stations in Powys
Railway stations in Great Britain opened in 1870
Railway stations in Great Britain closed in 1962
1870 establishments in Wales
1962 disestablishments in Wales